WideStudio is an open-source integrated development environment for desktop applications purely made in Japan. This enables you to develop GUI applications that can run on Windows 95/98/Me/NT/2000/XP/CE, Linux, FreeBSD, SOLARIS, Mac OS X (w/X11), BTRON, T-Engine, mu-CLinux (wo/X11) in various programming languages such as C/C++, Java, Perl, Ruby, Python, OCaml.

Due to how it is built using the MWT (Multi-Platform Widget Toolkit), WideStudio applications are source compatible between the platforms named above.

External links
 WideStudio official site
 WideStudio on Sourceforge.net

Linux integrated development environments
Free integrated development environments